Safiabad (also Romanized as Şafīābād) is a village in Akhtarabad Rural District, in the Central District of Malard County, Tehran Province, Iran. At the 2006 census, its population was 40, in 8 families.

References 

Populated places in Malard County